J. R. R. Tolkien's maps, depicting his fictional Middle-earth and other places in his legendarium, helped him with plot development, guided the reader through his often complex stories, and contributed to the impression of depth and worldbuilding in his writings. 

Tolkien stated that he began with maps and developed his plots from them, but that he also wanted his maps to be picturesque. Later fantasy writers also often include maps in their novels.

The publisher Allen & Unwin commissioned Pauline Baynes to paint a map of Middle-earth, based on Tolkien's draft maps and his annotations; it became iconic. A later redrafting of the maps by the publisher HarperCollins however made the maps look blandly professional, losing the hand-drawn feeling of Tolkien's maps.

Maps

The Hobbit 

The Hobbit contains two simple maps and only around 50 placenames. In the view of the Tolkien critic Tom Shippey, the maps are largely decorative in the "Here be tygers" tradition, adding nothing to the story. The first is Thror's map, in the fiction handed down to Thorin, showing little but the Lonely Mountain drawn in outline with ridgelines and entrances, and parts of two rivers, decorated with a spider and its web, English labels and arrows, and two texts written in runes. The other is a drawing of "Wilderland", from Rivendell in the west to the Lonely Mountain and Smaug the dragon in the east. The Misty Mountains are drawn in three dimensions. Mirkwood is shown as a mixture of closely packed tree symbols, spiders and their webs, hills, lakes, and villages. The map is overprinted with placenames in red. Both maps have a heavy vertical line not far from the left-hand side, the one on the map of Wilderland marked "Edge of the Wild". This line represented the printed delineation of the margin of the school paper, which came with the printed instruction "Do not write in this margin".

The Lord of the Rings 

The Lord of the Rings contains three maps and over 600 placenames. The maps are a large drawing of the north-west part of Middle-earth, showing mountains as if seen in three dimensions, and coasts with multiple waterlines; a more detailed drawing of "A Part of the Shire"; and a contour map by Christopher Tolkien of parts of Rohan, Gondor, and Mordor, very different in style. 

Tolkien worked for many years on the book, using a hand-drawn map of the whole of the north-west of Middle-earth on squared (not graph) paper, each 2cm square representing 100 miles. The map had many annotations in pencil and a range of different inks added over the years, the older ones faded until almost illegible. The paper became soft, torn and yellowed through intensive use, and a fold down the centre had to be mended using parcel tape.

He made a detailed pencil, ink and coloured pencil design on graph paper, enlarged five times in length from the main map of Middle-earth. His son Christopher drew the contour map from the design. The finished map faithfully reproduced the contours, features and labels of his father's design, but omitted the route (with dates) taken by the Hobbits Frodo and Sam on their way to destroy the One Ring in Mount Doom. Father and son worked desperately to finish the map in time for publication: 

Shippey notes that many of the places mapped are never used in the text. The map of the Shire is the only one to include political boundaries, in the shape of the divisions between the administrative districts or Farthings.

The Silmarillion 

The first edition of The Silmarillion contains two maps. There is a large fold-out drawing of Beleriand. The Ered Luin mountain range on its right-hand edge approximately matches the mountain range of that name on the left-hand edge of the main map in The Lord of the Rings. The other is a smaller-scale drawing of the central region of the same area, with coasts, mountains, and rivers but without forests, overprinted in red with the names of the leaders of the Elves in each part of Beleriand.

The other continents and regions described in The Silmarillion are not mapped in the book, but Tolkien drew sketches of Arda in its early stages including of Valinor (Aman), and a map of the star-shaped island of Numenor, with little detail other than coasts (with waterlining) and mountains, which was eventually printed in Unfinished Tales. Some other absences may be significant; Christopher Tolkien wrote that the frequently mentioned Dwarf-road over the mountains bordering Beleriand is not shown, because the Noldorin Elves who lived there never crossed the mountains.

Style 

The style of Tolkien's maps mixes illustrative principles and purpose with cartographical practice. Alice Campbell, in The J. R. R. Tolkien Encyclopedia, writes that while they have what Tolkien called an "archaic air", they are not authentically medieval in style. In particular, he allows for blank spaces between features, an 18th-century innovation that meant that the features that were drawn were reliable. Campbell states that Tolkien's mapping style echoes William Morris's Arts and Crafts: "they are functional, but with an eye to grace and beauty", and in her view lie somewhere between illustration and cartography.

Tolkien indeed wrote that "there should be picturesque maps, providing more than a mere index to what is said in the text". His maps thus have at least three functions: to help the author construct a consistent plot; to guide the reader; and through the "picturesque", the aesthetic experience, to lead the reader into the imagined secondary world.

From map to plot

In 1954, Tolkien wrote in a letter to the novelist Naomi Mitchison that  

Tolkien developed not only maps but names and languages before he arrived at a plot. He had already used Old Norse for the Dwarves of Dale (to the east) in The Hobbit, and he was using modern English for the Hobbits of the Shire (in the west); his choice of Old English for the riders of Rohan implied a linguistic map of Middle-earth, with different peoples, languages and regions.

Karen Wynn Fonstad, author of The Atlas of Middle-earth, commented that in such a world, writing has to be based on detailed knowledge of each of many types of details; she found herself, as Tolkien had, unable to proceed with the atlas until she had mastered all of them. Distances travelled, the chronology of the quest, geology, and terrain all needed to be understood to create the work.

Impression of depth 

Campbell stated that the "lovingly detailed" maps helped to shape the stories and create a "believable whole". In Shippey's view, "the names and the maps give Middle-earth that air of solidity and extent both in space and time which its successors [in 20th century fantasy] so conspicuously lack". One way that this works, he argues, is that readers, far from analysing the etymology of place-names as Tolkien habitually did, take them as labels, "as things .. in a very close one-to-one relationship with whatever they label". That in turn makes them "extraordinarily useful to fantasy, weighing it down as they do with repeated implicit assurances of the existence of the things they label, and of course of their nature and history too."

Fantasy maps before and after Tolkien

Antecedents 

The frontispiece to William Morris's 1897 The Sundering Flood was a map showing the city on a great river, "The Wood Masterless", a "Desert Waste", and towns with English names like "Westcheaping" and "Eastcheaping". The map appears to have been the first fantasy map in the modern sense, defining a wholly invented world. Tolkien stated that he wished to imitate the style and content of Morris's romances, and that he made use of elements from them.
Other published examples Tolkien may have had in mind while creating his maps include those of Jonathan Swift, who included maps in his 1726 Gulliver's Travels, and those of Robert Louis Stevenson in his 1883 adventure story Treasure Island.

Influence 

Critics agree that Tolkien's maps set a completely new standard for fantasy novels, so that their use has become expected in the genre, which he largely created. Peter Jackson chose to use Tolkien's Middle-earth map in his Lord of the Rings film trilogy. Among later bestselling fantasy authors, George R. R. Martin has used maps in all his A Song of Ice and Fire books, 
starting with A Game of Thrones.

Derived maps

Iconic poster map 

In 1969, Tolkien's publisher Allen & Unwin commissioned the illustrator Pauline Baynes to paint a map of Middle-earth. Tolkien supplied her with copies of his draft maps for The Lord of the Rings, and annotated her copy of his son Christopher's 1954 map for The Fellowship of the Ring. Allen & Unwin published Baynes's map as a poster in 1970. It was decorated with a header and footer showing some of Tolkien's characters, and vignettes of some of his stories' locations. The poster map became "iconic" of Middle-earth. She was the only illustrator of whom Tolkien approved.

Redraftings 

Campbell writes that the redrafting of the maps by the publishers HarperCollins for a later edition of The Lord of the Rings made the cartography "bland, modern, professional illustration". In her view, this is "an unintentional reversion to decorative but technically inaccurate medieval-style maps", something that she finds misguided, as in his maps "Tolkien desired accuracy more than decoration". In addition, the redrafting loses what she calls "the illusion of Bilbo's own fair copies of older maps and which suggested a culture without printing presses or engraving", through Tolkien's own "charming hand lettering".

Fan cartography 

The Tolkien universe has been subject to significant cartographic efforts by fans, some of whom have published their works in print. These include Karen Wynn Fonstad's The Atlas of Middle-earth.

References

Primary 
This list identifies each item's location in Tolkien's writings.

Secondary

Sources

External links 

 Insights into Mapping the Imagined World of J.R.R. Tolkien by Sabine Timpf, Professor of Geoinformatics, Augsburg University

 
Middle-earth
Fictional maps
Themes of The Lord of the Rings